Anacronicta nitida is a moth of the family Noctuidae. It is found in Taiwan, Japan and the Kuriles.

The wingspan is 48–52 mm.

References

Moths described in 1878
Pantheinae
Moths of Japan